César Augusto Ramos Robles (born 2 July 1971) is a Dominican Republic boxer. He competed in the men's welterweight event at the 1992 Summer Olympics.

References

External links
 

1971 births
Living people
Dominican Republic male boxers
Olympic boxers of the Dominican Republic
Boxers at the 1992 Summer Olympics
Place of birth missing (living people)
Welterweight boxers